Andrew Eugene Bellisario  (born December 19, 1956) is an American prelate of the Roman Catholic Church who has been serving as archbishop of the Archdiocese of Anchorage-Juneau in Alaska since 2020.

Bellisario served as bishop of the former Diocese of Juneau from 2017 to 2019 and as apostolic administrator of the former Archdiocese of Anchorage for almost a year.

Biography

Early life 
Born in Los Angeles on December 19, 1956, Andrew Bellisario is the son of Rocky and Mildred Bellisario.  In 1975, he graduated from Saint Vincent's Seminary High School in Montebello, California.

In 1975, Bellisario entered the Congregation of the Mission (Vicentians). After finishing his novitiate, he went to Saint Mary's of the Barrens Seminary College in Perryville, Missouri, receiving a Bachelor of Philosophy degree in 1976.  In 1980, Bellisario was awarded a Master of Divinity degree from De Andreis Institute of Theology in Lemont, Illinois.

Priesthood 
On June 16, 1984, Bellisario was ordained by Archbishop Paul Etienne into the priesthood for the Congregation of the Mission. After his ordination, Bellisario had the following pastoral assignments in Southern California parishes:

 Parochial vicar and administrator of Our Lady of the Miraculous Medal in Montebello
 Pastor of Saint Vincent de Paul in Huntington Beach 
 Pastor of Sacred Heart in Patterson.

Bellisario later became the director of the De Paul Evangelization Center in Montebello.  He also served as the provincial superior of the Vincentians, Province of the West, and as the director of the Daughters of Charity, Province of Los Altos Hills.

Bellisario was then assigned to Alaska as director of the Vincentian International missions there. In May 2016, he was named pastor of Our Lady of Guadalupe Co-Cathedral Parish in the Archdiocese of Anchorage in Anchorage, Alaska.

Bishop of Juneau

On July 11, 2017, Pope Francis appointed Bellisario as bishop of the Diocese of Juneau. He was consecrated by Bishop Paul Etienne on October 10, 2017, at St. Paul the Apostle Church in Juneau, Alaska. At his installation mass, Bellisario remarked:In 2018, Bellisario appointed an independent commission to investigate claims of sexual abuse against priests in the Diocese of Juneau.  The commission included several retired judges and a retired police lieutenant.  On August 22, 2019, the commission released its report.  It found seven priests and one brother who were credibly accused of sexual abuses of minors.  Bellisario made this statement:On June 7, 2019, Pope Francis appointed Bellisario to also serve as apostolic administrator of the Archdiocese of Anchorage following the appointment of Archbishop Paul D. Eitenne as Archbishop of Seattle.

Archbishop of Anchorage-Juneau 
On May 19, 2020, Pope Francis named Bellisario as archbishop of the newly formed Archdiocese of Anchorage-Juneau.  Bellisario was installed on September 17, 2020.

Coat of Arms

Left side of shield, Diocese of Juneau 
 The Wavy Silver and Blue lines: represents the water routes uniting the parishes and missions of the diocese.
 The Constellation Ursa Major, the Great Bear: The constellation includes the Big Dipper with its two pointers to the North Star.
 The North Star (Polaris): represents Mary, mother of Jesus, under her title "Our Lady, Star of the Sea" (Stella Maris).  It also represents the constant guide of the mariner, explorer, hunter, trapper, prospector, woodsman and surveyor of Alaska.
 The Crescent Moon: represents the nativity of the Virgin Mary, and commemorates the cathedral church of the diocese.

Right side of shield, Bellisario's coat of arms 
 The Cross of Saint Andrew: represents Andrew the Apostle, Bellisario's patron saint.
 The Long Stem Rose: represents Bellisario's mother, Mildred (1922–2006), and his English heritage.
 The Ship: represents the Catholic Church, the bark of Saint Peter. It also represents Bellisario's father, Rocky (1915–2005), the Bellisario family and his Italian heritage.
 The Sacred Heart of Jesus+: represents Jesus and commemorates Bellisario's religious community, the Congregation of the Mission.
 The Immaculate Heart of Mary+: represents the Virgin Mary and commemorates the Daughters of Charity of Saint Vincent de Paul.
+ Both hearts are taken from the reverse side of the Miraculous Medal.

Motto: "Rich in Mercy" (Dives in Misericordia)

See also

 Catholic Church hierarchy
 Catholic Church in the United States
 Historical list of the Catholic bishops of the United States
 List of Catholic bishops of the United States
 Lists of patriarchs, archbishops, and bishops

References

External links
  Roman Catholic Diocese of Juneau Official Site

 

1956 births
Living people
People from Alhambra, California
21st-century Roman Catholic archbishops in the United States
Roman Catholic bishops of Juneau
Catholics from California
Vincentian bishops
Bishops appointed by Pope Francis
American Roman Catholic bishops by contiguous area of the United States